Provence Rugby is a French rugby union club currently playing in Rugby Pro D2, the second tier of France's league system. They were promoted back to the second level for the 2018–19 season after 2 seasons in Fédérale 1.

Based in Aix-en-Provence in the Bouches-du-Rhône just north of Marseille, the club was founded in 1970. They currently play at Stade Maurice David and wear black. The club was known as Aix Rugby Club from 1970 to 2001, and Pays d'Aix Rugby Club (PARC) from 2001 to 2015.

At the end of 2004/5 they were promoted to Pro D2 but were relegated back to Fédérale 1 at the end of the season. They would return to Pro D2 as runners-up to Lannemezan in 2009. In the 2009–10 season, they finished next-to-last on the league table, in a relegation spot. However, they were reprieved when Top 14 club Montauban filed for bankruptcy and were relegated directly to Fédérale 1. They would suffer the drop after the 2012-13 season, not returning until 2015–16.

By that time, they had changed their name to the current Provence Rugby, officially announcing the name change on 22 June 2015.

Provence finished last in the 2015–16 Pro D2 season. Initially, they were spared relegation when four clubs were relegated to Fédérale 1 due to financial mismanagement, but three of these eventually won appeals and remained in Pro D2, consigning Provence to the drop.

Honours

 Fédérale 1:
 Champions: 2004, 2015, 2018
 Runners-up: 2009
 Deuxième Division:
 Champions: 1986

Current standings

Current squad

The Provence squad for the 2021–22 season:

Notable former players 

 Jean-Luc Aqua
 Guillaume Delmotte
 Norman Jordaan
 Yannick Ricardo (Portuguese international)
 George Kutarashvili (Georgian international)
 Legi Matiu (French international)
 Mihai Lazăr (Romanian international)
 Ovidiu Toniţa (Romanian international)
 Bertus Smit (South African Tighthead Prop)
 Chris Wyatt (Welsh international)

References

External links
 Provence Rugby - Official site 

French rugby union clubs
Sport in Bouches-du-Rhône
Rugby clubs established in 1970
1970 establishments in France
Aix-en-Provence